Daleville may refer to these places in the United States:

Daleville, Alabama
Daleville, Indiana
Daleville, Mississippi
Daleville, Virginia